Aubencheul-aux-Bois is a commune in the department of Aisne in the Hauts-de-France region of northern France.

Geography
Aubencheul-aux-Bois is located some 20 km south of Cambrai and 30 km east of Combles.  The northwest border of the commune is the border between Aisne and Nord departments.  The D644 road from La Gaite in the north runs south along the western border of the commune changing to D1044 in the commune and continuing south to Le Catelet. The D16 road runs east from the D644 to the village changing to D281 within the commune then continuing east as the D16 to Villers-Outreaux. The commune is composed entirely of farmland.

Two streams rise in the commune, one flowing southwest and the other flowing east.

Neighbouring communes and villages

History

Aubencheul-aux-Bois was the seat of a small abbey founded in the 11th century in the middle of the forest of Arrouaise. It was part of the province of Cambrésis. The village was ravaged in 1584 by the Duke of Parma and in 1636 by the Spaniards. The first inhabitants back to 1663 were the families of Loubry, Lévêque, Grau, Deboucq, Dessains, Dessenne, Guéguin, Carpentier, Milhem, Ferlier, Fichaux, Bernerd, Biar, Simon, Val, Bancourt, Noblécourt, Dubois, Caré, Faucon, Dazin, Savary, Malézieux, Lanthoine, Coupé, Pattée, Dambraine, Gressier, Thibaut, Billon, Domont, and Bantigny. On 16 July 1735, after five days of strong winds, a swarm of grasshoppers destroyed the stocks of straw and hay. There was a shortage in 1709 due to the freezing conditions from January to March with most fruit trees and corn crop being destroyed. This happened again in 1740 when poverty was extreme until the end of harvest in 1741 - during the famine the population lost about a quarter of its population. On 15 June 1839 a tornado a mile wide with hail as large as chicken eggs arrived and everything was destroyed. A fire destroyed 63 houses on 17 June 1827. In 1848 there was famine, in 1849 Cholera. The village was almost completely destroyed during the First World War.

Administration

List of Successive Mayors of Aubencheul-aux-Bois

Population

Sites and Monuments

 A Church, rebuilt after the 1914-18 war in a neo-Romanesque style mostly in brick.

See also
 Communes of the Aisne department

External links
 Aubencheul-aux-Bois on the old IGN website 
 Aubencheul-aux-Bois on Géoportail, National Geographic Institute (IGN) website 
 Aubancheul aux Bois on the 1750 Cassini Map

Notes and references

Notes

References

Communes of Aisne